Thysanophoridae is a family of air-breathing land snails, terrestrial pulmonate gastropod mollusks in the superfamily Helicoidea (according to the taxonomy of the Gastropoda by Bouchet & Rocroi, 2005).

These are common woodland snails of North America. They also occur in a few recorded spots in South America.

This family is defined by the absence of both a diverticulum and a stimulatory organ.

Subfamilies 
There are no subfamilies in Thysanophoridae.

Genera
Genera within the family Thysanophoridae include:
Hojeda H. B. Baker, 1926
 Itzamna (unconfirmed)
Lyroconus (unconfirmed)
 Mcleania (unconfirmed)
Microconus (unconfirmed)
Microphysula Cockerell, 1926 - Spruce snails
Miroconus (unconfirmed)
Pulchriconus (unconfirmed)
Setidiscus (unconfirmed)
Suavitas (unconfirmed)
Thysanophora Strebel & Pfeffer, 1880 - the type genus

References